Mehmet Aktaş (born 1966 in Iğdır, Turkey) is a Kurdish filmmaker, producer, author and journalist born in Turkey but living in Germany. He is founder and chief executive of the film production and distribution company Mîtosfilm in Berlin.

In the middle of the 1990s Aktaş came to Germany after he had finished his studies at law school in Istanbul. In Germany he was wondering because as well the German people as the institutions disregarded Near Eastern cinema, especially the Kurdish cinema. Therefore, he founded the first Kurdish Film Festival in Germany in 2002 which has been supported by the "Hauptstadtkulturfonds".

With Mîtosfilm Aktaş produced feature films like Close up Kurdistan (2007) directed by Yüksel Yavuz, Land of Legend (2008) directed by Rahim Zabihi, and Après la Chute (2009) directed by Hiner Saleem. In 2009 Mehmet Aktaş was successful as producer of No One knows about Persian Cats directed by Bahman Ghobadi which was honored at the Film Festival Cannes with the award Un Certain Regard.

Mîtosfilm also functions as filmdistribution, focusing on new Turkish, Kurdish, Iraqi and Iranian auteur cinema. Since 2004 Mîtosfilm has also released films in German cinemas: Turtles can fly (2004), Two Girls from Istanbul (2005), Süt (2008) and Min dît (2010). These films illustrate Aktaş' political aspiration of giving a more authentic image of the life in the Near East than the local news.

Mehmet Aktaş also wrote the screenplay for Hisham Zaman's second feature film Letter to the King (2014) which received the Dragon Award for Best Nordic Film at Goteborg Film Festival 2014. Mîtosfilm's latest production Memories on Stone (2014) directed by Shawkat Amin Korki and written by Mehmet Aktaş and Korki was awarded at Abu Dhabi Film Festival 2014 as Best Film from the Arab World. Korki won the prize as "Best Director" at Cinedays Skopje – 13th Festival of European Film. "Memories on Stone" was released in Swiss cinema-theaters by the prestigious distributor Trigon Film in November 2014.

Since 2011 Aktaş is also artistic director for the Duhok International Film Festival.

Filmography 
2016: Gulîstan, Land of Roses; Director:  Zaynê Akyol

2015: Reseba – The Dark Wind; Director: Hussein Hassan

2014/2015: House Without Roof; Director: Soleen Yusef -in pre-production-

2014: Memories On Stone; Director: Shawkat Amin Korki

2014: Song of my mother; Director: Erol Mintaş

2013: Before Snowfall; Director: Hisham Zaman

2009: No One Knows About Persian Cats; Director: Bahman Ghobadi

2009: Après La Chute; Director: Hiner Saleem

2008: Land Of Legend; Director: Rahim Zabihi

2008: Dol; Director: Hiner Saleem

Documentaries

2014/2015: The Legend Of The Ugly King – Yilmaz Güney; Director: Hüseyin Tabak -in production-

2007: Close up Kurdistan; Director: Yüksel Yavuz

2005: Traces (Le peuple du Paon); Director: Binevsa Bêrîvan

2003: Daf – Tambourine; Director: Bahman Ghobadi

2004: The War Is Over; Director: Bahman Ghobadi

As author

2014: Memories On Stone; Director: Shawkat Amin Korki

2014: Letter to the King; Director: Hisham Zaman

Awards 

 Memories on Stone:

ABU DHABI FILM FESTIVAL, Best Film of the Arab World

ASIA PACIFIC SCREEN AWARDS, Unesco Award

CINEDAYS FESTIVAL OF EUROPEAN FILM SKOPJE, Best Director

FANTASPORTO FILM FESTIVAL, Best Script, Best Director, Special Mention of the Critics

PEACE ON EARTH FILM FESTIVAL, Best Feature Film

RIVER RUN FILM FESTIVAL, Best Feature Film

 Song Of My Mother

20. SARAJEVO FILM FESTIVAL, Heart of Sarajevo for Best Film

Letter To The King

AMANDA AWARD (NORWAY), Best Screenplay

GÖTEBORG INTERNATIONAL FILM FESTIVAL, Dragon Award for Best Nordic Film

LECCE FESTIVAL OF EUROPEAN CINEMA, Fipresci Prize

DUBAI INTERNATIONAL FILM FESTIVAL, Special Mention

DUHOK INTERNATIONAL FILM FESTIVAL, Best Kurdish script

References

External links 
 

1966 births
Living people
Kurdish film directors